Live at the Murat is the fourth live album by American progressive rock band Umphrey's McGee, recorded over Easter Weekend at the Murat Centre's Egyptian Room in Indianapolis, Indiana. The album was released October 16, 2007. The album contains favorites such as "Push the Pig", "The Triple Wide", "In the Kitchen", "Nothing Too Fancy", and "Padgett's Profile".

Track listing

Chart performance

Personnel 
Brendan Bayliss: guitar, vocals
Jake Cinninger: guitar, vocals
Joel Cummins: keyboards, vocals
Ryan Stasik: bass
Kris Myers: drums, vocals
Andy Farag: percussion

References

External links 
Album announcement (September 4, 2007) Retrieved on September 4, 2007

Umphrey's McGee albums
2007 live albums